A carabiner or karabiner, often shortened to biner, colloquially known as (climbing) clip, is a specialized type of shackle, a metal loop with a spring-loaded gate used to quickly and reversibly connect components, most notably in safety-critical systems. The word is a shortened form of Karabinerhaken (or also short Karabiner), a German phrase for a "spring hook" used by a carbine rifleman, or carabinier, to attach his carabin to a belt or bandolier.

Use
Carabiners are widely used in rope-intensive activities such as climbing, fall arrest systems,  arboriculture, caving, sailing, hot-air ballooning, rope rescue, construction, industrial rope work, window cleaning, whitewater rescue, and acrobatics. They are predominantly made from both steel and aluminium. Those used in sports tend to be of a lighter weight than those used in commercial applications and rope rescue. 

Often referred to as carabiner-style or as mini-carabiners, carabiner keyrings and other light-use clips of similar style and design have also become popular. Most are stamped with a "not for climbing" or similar warning due to a common lack of load-testing and safety standards in manufacturing.

While any metal link with a spring-loaded gate is technically a carabiner, the strict usage among the climbing community specifically refers only to devices manufactured and tested for load-bearing in safety-critical systems like rock and mountain climbing, typically rated to 20 kN or more.

Carabiners on hot-air balloons are used to connect the envelope to the basket and are rated at 2.5, 3, or 4 tonnes.

Load-bearing screw-gate carabiners are used to connect the diver's umbilical to the surface supplied diver's harness. They are usually rated for a safe working load of 5 kN or more (equivalent to a weight in excess of approximately 500 kg).

Types

Shape
Carabiners come in four characteristic shapes:
Oval: Symmetric. Most basic and utilitarian. Smooth regular curves are gentle on equipment and allow easy repositioning of loads. Their greatest disadvantage is that a load is shared equally on both the strong solid spine and the weaker gated axis.
D: Asymmetric shape transfers the majority of the load on to the spine, the carabiner's strongest axis.
Offset-D: Variant of a D with a greater asymmetry, allowing for a wider gate opening.
Pear/HMS: Wider and rounder shape at the top than offset-D's, and typically larger. Used for belaying with a munter hitch, and with some types of  belay device. The largest HMS carabiners can also be used for rappelling with a munter hitch (the size is needed to accommodate the hitch with two strands of rope). These are usually the heaviest carabiners.

Locking mechanisms
Carabiners fall into three broad  locking categories: non-locking, manual locking, and auto locking.

Non-locking
Non-locking carabiners (or snap-links) have a sprung swinging gate that accepts a rope, webbing sling, or other hardware. Rock climbers frequently connect two non-locking carabiners with a short length of webbing to create a quickdraw (an extender).

Two gate types are common:

 Solid gate: The more traditional carabiner design, incorporating a solid metal gate with separate pin and spring mechanisms. Most modern carabiners feature a 'key-lock nose shape and gate opening, which is less prone to snagging than traditional notch and pin design. Most locking carabiners are based on the solid gate design.
 Wire gate: A single piece of bent spring-steel wire forms the gate. Wire gate carabiners are significantly lighter than solid gates, with roughly the same strength. Wire gates are less prone to icing up than solid gates, an advantage in Alpine mountaineering and ice climbing. The reduced gate mass makes their wire bales less prone to "gate flutter", a dangerous condition created when the carabiner suddenly impacts rock or other hard surfaces during a fall, and the gate opens momentarily due to momentum (and both lowers the breaking strength of the carabiner when open, and potentially allows the rope to escape). Simple wiregate designs feature a notch that can snag objects (similar to original solid gate designs), but newer designs feature a shroud or guide wires around the "hooked" part of the carabiner nose to prevent snagging.

Both solid and wire gate carabiners can be either "straight gate" or "bent gate". Bent-gate carabiners are easier to clip a rope into using only one hand, and so are often used for the rope-end carabiner of quickdraws and alpine draws used for lead climbing.

Locking

Locking carabiners have the same general shape as non-locking carabiners, but have an additional mechanism securing the gate to prevent unintentional opening during use. These mechanisms may be either threaded sleeves ("screw-lock"), spring-loaded sleeves ("twist-lock"), magnetic levers ("Magnetron"), other spring loaded unlocking levers or opposing double spring loaded gates ("twin-gate").

Manual
 Screw-lock (or screw gate): Have a threaded sleeve over the gate which must be engaged and disengaged manually. They have fewer moving parts than spring-loaded mechanisms, are less prone to malfunctioning due to contamination or component fatigue, and are easier to employ one-handed. They, however, require more total effort and are more time-consuming than pull-lock, twist-lock or lever-lock.

Auto-locking

 Twist-lock, push-lock, twist-and-push-lock: Have a security sleeve over the gate which must be manually rotated and/or pulled to disengage, but which springs automatically to locked position upon release.  They offer the advantage of re-engaging without additional user input, but being spring-loaded are prone to both spring fatigue and their more complex mechanisms becoming balky from dirt, ice, or other contamination. They are also difficult to open one-handed and with gloves on, and sometimes jam, getting stuck after being tightened under load, and being very hard to undo once the load is removed.
 Multiple-levers: Having at least two spring loaded levers that are each operated with one hand.
 Magnetic: Have two small levers with embedded magnets on either side of the locking gate which must be pushed towards each other or pinched simultaneously to unlock. Upon release the levers pull shut and into the locked position against a small steel insert in the carabiner nose. With the gate open the magnets in the two levers repel each other so they do not lock or stick together, which might prevent the gate from closing properly. Advantages are very easy one-handed operation, re-engaging without additional user input and few mechanical parts that can fail.
Double-Gate: Have two opposed overlapping gates at the opening which prevent a rope or anchor from inadvertently passing through the gate in either direction. Gates may only be opened by pushing outwards from in between towards either direction. The carabiner can therefore be opened by splitting the gates with a fingertip, allowing easy one hand operation. The likelihood of a rope under tension to split the gates is therefore practically none. The lack of a rotating lock prevents a rolling knot, such as the Munter hitch, from unlocking the gate and passing through, giving a measure of inherent safety in use and reducing mechanical complexity.

Certification

Europe
Recreation: Carabiners sold for use in climbing in Europe must conform to standard EN 12275:1998 "Mountaineering equipment – Connectors – Safety requirements and test methods", which governs testing protocols, rated strengths, and markings. A breaking strength of at least 20 kN (20,000 newtons = approximately 2040 kilograms of force which is significantly more than the weight of a small car) with the gate closed and 7 kN with the gate open is the standard for most climbing applications, although requirements vary depending on the activity. Carabiners are marked on the side with single letters showing their intended area of use, for example, K (via ferrata), B (base), and H (for belaying with an Italian or Munter hitch).
Industry: Carabiners used for access in commercial and industrial environments within Europe must comply with EN 362:2004 "Personal protective equipment against falls from a height. Connectors." The minimum gate closed breaking strength of a carabiner conforming with EN 362:2004 is nominally the same as that of EN 12275:1998 at around 20 kN. Carabiners complying with both EN 12275:1998 and EN 362:2004 are available.

United States
Climbing and mountaineering: Minimum breaking strength (MBS) requirements and calculations for climbing and mountaineering carabiners in the USA are set out in ASTM Standard F1774. This standard calls for a MBS of 20kN on the long axis, and 7kN on the short axis (cross load). 
Rescue: Carabiners used for rescue are addressed in ASTM F1956. This document addresses two classifications of carabiners, light use and heavy-duty. Light use carabiners are the most widely used, and are commonly found in applications including technical rope rescue, mountain rescue, cave rescue, cliff rescue, military, SWAT, and even by some non-NFPA fire departments. ASTM requirements for light use carabiners are 27 kN MBS on the long axis, 7kN on the short axis. Requirements for the lesser-used heavy duty rescue carabiners are 40kN MBS long axis, 10.68kN short axis.
Fire rescue: Minimum breaking strength requirements and calculations for rescue carabiners used by NFPA compliant agencies are set out in National Fire Protection Association standard 1983-2012 edition Fire Service Life Safety Rope and Equipment. The standard defines two classes of rescue carabiners. Technical use rescue carabiners are required to have minimum breaking strengths of 27 kN gate closed, 7 kN gate open and 7 kN minor axis. General use rescue carabiners are required to have minimum breaking strengths of 40 kN gate closed, 11 kN gate open and 11 kN minor axis. Testing procedures for rescue carabiners are set out in ASTM International standard F 1956 Standard Specification of Rescue Carabiners.

American National Standards Institute/American Society of Safety Engineers standard ANSI Z359.1-2007 Safety Requirement for Personal Fall Arrest Systems, Subsystems and Components, section 3.2.1.4 (for snap hooks and carabiners) is a voluntary consensus standard.

See also
 Maillon
 Lobster clasp
 Rock-climbing equipment
 Glossary of climbing terms

References

Climbing equipment
Caving equipment
German inventions
Mountaineering equipment
Fasteners